António Augusto Lopes (born 15 September 1901 – unknown)  was a Portuguese footballer, who played as a forward.

External links 
 
 

1901 births
Portuguese footballers
Association football forwards
Portugal international footballers
Year of death missing
Place of birth missing